John Peden (12 July 1863 – 15 September 1944) was an Irish footballer who played as an outside left for Newton Heath and Sheffield United in the 1890s. He made 24 appearances and scored seven goals for Ireland in a 12-year international career, interrupted by a two-year gap while he played in England (England-based players were not selected for the Ireland national team until 1899).

Born in Belfast, Peden began his career with Linfield as a 21-year-old in 1886. He signed for Newton Heath in February 1893, but did not make his debut for the Manchester side until the opening game of the 1893–94 season against Burnley on 2 September 1893. Peden left the Heathens at the end of the season to join Sheffield United, but he could not hold down a first-team place with the Yorkshire side, and returned to Ireland to play for Distillery. He finally returned to Linfield in 1898 before retiring at the end of the 1898–99 season.

References

Sources

1865 births
1944 deaths
Association footballers from Belfast
Irish association footballers (before 1923)
Association football forwards
Linfield F.C. players
Manchester United F.C. players
Sheffield United F.C. players
Lisburn Distillery F.C. players
Pre-1950 IFA international footballers